Cesáreo Leonardo Berisso Pascal (6 November 1887 -  28 July 1971) was a Uruguayan aviation pioneer.

Biography 
Cesáreo Berisso was born in Piedras Blancas, Montevideo, the son of Cesáreo Berisso y Mariana Pascal. He attended the Escuela Militar del Uruguay from 1907 until 1911, leaving with the rank of Artillery Gun Alférez.

Berisso was one of the first graduates from the Military Aviation School at Los Cerrillos. On 22 June 1913, he carried out the first solo flight by a Uruguayan, flying from Los Cerrillos to Playa Malvín in 1 hour 45 minutes.

In 1916, Berisso became an instructor at the school. The same year, he became the first Uruguayan to cross the Río de la Plata in a hot air balloon, flying solo from Buenos Aires province to San Jose Department. He later achieved the rank of Major, and was the director of the aviation school from 1922 to 1931.

In the mid-1920s, Berisso carried out various long-distance flights in South America. In 1925, he attempted to fly a route from Montevideo to Asunción, Rosario, Santa Fe and Mendoza but was unable to cross the Andes. The flight covered 4,500 km and lasted 32 hours.

In 1929, Berisso designed and constructed the first aeroplane built in Uruguay, which he named Montevideo. With three co-pilots, he attempted to fly the plane from Montevideo to New York. The crew crossed the Andes, and flew over Chile, Peru and Ecuador, but the aircraft suffered a mechanical failure in Colombia, forcing it to crash-land. The crew were unhurt.

Berisso was promoted to Lieutenant-Colonel, Inspector of Aeronautical Arms, and finally General in 1944. In 1946 he was named Director General of Military Aeronautics. He retired from military activity in 1947 but continued to work in civil aviation, becoming the first president of Pluna Ente Autónomo.

Berisso assembled three commissions to plan and construct a national airport for Uruguay, serving as president of the second commission and a member of the final one. On 19 September 1944, he became the first pilot to land at the recently inaugurated Aeropuerto de Carrasco, which he had helped to plan.

Legacy
In 1994, Montevideo's Carrasco International Airport was officially named after Berisso, in recognition of his civil and military aviation achievements. A military base situated at the airport was also named after him. A monument in front of the airport's passenger terminal and a small museum on its terrace commemorate Berisso.

In 2002, the non-profit Cesáreo Berisso Foundation was created to provide assistance for Uruguayan Air Force families, and named in his memory.

References 

Uruguayan aviators
Aviation pioneers
1887 births
1971 deaths
Uruguayan Air Force generals